Bartosch is a surname. Notable people with the surname include:

Berthold Bartosch (1893–1968), German animator
Dave Bartosch (1917–2006), American baseball player
Heinrich Bartosch, Austrian sport shooter

See also
Carin Bartosch Edström (born 1965), Swedish classical composer and writer